Moti Tay Dogar is a 1983 Pakistani Punjabi language action film.

Directed by Jahangir Qaisar and produced by Shahid Mir. Film starring actor Mustafa Qureshi, Sultan Rahi, Mumtaz and Adeeb.

Cast
 Mustafa Qureshi - (Moti Dogar)
 Sultan Rahi
 Mumtaz
 Zumurrud
 Nazli
 Mazhar Shah
 Sawan
 Sheikh Iqbal
 M. Ajmal
 Afzal Khan
 Adeeb
 Bahar - (Malika-E- Jazbat)

Track list
The music of the film is by musician Zulfiqar Ali. The lyrics are penned by Saeed Gillani and singers are Noor Jehan, Shaukat Ali.

References

Pakistani action drama films
1980s action drama films
Punjabi-language Pakistani films
1983 films
1980s Punjabi-language films
1983 drama films